"Chapter 17: The Apostate" is the first episode of the third season of the American streaming television series The Mandalorian. It was written by showrunner Jon Favreau and directed by series executive producer Rick Famuyiwa. It was released on Disney+ on March 1, 2023. The episode received positive reviews from critics.

Plot 
The Armorer forges a new helmet for a foundling who is being accepted into the creed. A ceremony is held where he must vow to never remove his helmet. This ceremony is interrupted when a crocodile-like monster attacks the tribe. The clan initially fails to defend themselves, but they are saved by the Mandalorian and Grogu, who have been reunited. The Mandalorian speaks with the Armorer, expressing his belief that he can go to Mandalore and bathe in the living waters. The Armorer agrees that he will be accepted back into the clan should he achieve this.

The Mandalorian and Grogu head to Nevarro, where they reunite with now High Magistrate Greef Karga. Karga offers the Mandalorian a place to live, however, he declines. The two are interrupted by a band of pirates who were members of Karga's guild. They kill all but one of them in a standoff, as they want him to inform others of Greef's strong force.

The Mandalorian explains that he plans to revive IG-11, as he needs a droid by his side on Mandalore. They retrieve what is left of IG-11's parts from his memorial statue, and attempt to revive him. They are eventually successful, but IG-11 reverts to his original programming and tries to kill Grogu. After shutting him down, they enlist the help of Anzellan mechanics. They inform the Mandalorian that he needs a memory core to fix IG-11. He leaves Nevarro in search of it and asks Karga to look after IG-11 while he is gone.

While attempting to leave Nevarro, the Mandalorian and Grogu are attacked by a band of pirates, including the one they spared earlier. They are eventually led to their leader Gorian Shard, who asks the Mandalorian to surrender his ship. The Mandalorian jumps to hyperspace and eventually heads to Kalevala, a planet in the Mandalore system, where Bo-Katan Kryze now resides. She explains to the Mandalorian that she no longer plans to overtake Mandalore, as her allies gave up on her, becoming mercenaries.

Production

Development 
The episode was directed by executive producer Rick Famuyiwa, from a screenplay by series creator Jon Favreau. Discussing the absence of Cara Dune in the season following the firing of actress Gina Carano, Famuyiwa said the character was still "a big part... of the world" and that Favreau took the time to address her absence. However, the creatives knew "the heart of the show" was the Mandalorian and Grogu with Dave Filoni stating the season was "mainly dealing with Mandalorians and the Mandalorian saga, the Mandalorian tale", and how that affects the duo's story.

Casting
The co-starring actors cast for this episode are all returning from previous episodes, and include Emily Swallow as The Armorer, Carl Weathers as Greef Karga, Taika Waititi as IG-11, and Tait Fletcher and Jon Favreau as Paz Vizsla. Additional guest starring actors cast for this episode include Jimmy Kimmel's nephew Wesley Kimmel as Ragnar, a Mandalorian foundling, Nonso Anozie as Gorian Shard, a pirate, and Shirley Henderson as the Anzellan crew, the droidsmiths who attempt to repair IG-11. Henderson previously played Babu Frik in Star Wars: The Rise of Skywalker where the species was first introduced. The Mandalorian is physically portrayed by stunt doubles Brendan Wayne and Lateef Crowder, with Wayne and Crowder receiving co-star credit for the first time in the episode. Pedro Pascal and Katee Sackhoff receive starring credits as the Mandalorian and Bo-Katan Kryze respectively.

Music 
Joseph Shirley composed the musical score for the episode, replacing Ludwig Göransson.

Reception 
On Rotten Tomatoes, the episode has a score of 85% based on reviews from 33 critics, with an average rating of 7.2/10. The website's critics consensus reads: "Consistently engaging in spite of all the table-setting for what's to come, The Mandalorian third-season opener kicks off a promising new quest for Din and Grogu". Metacritic, which uses a weighted average, assigned a score of 70 out of 100 based on 14 critics, indicating "generally favorable reviews".

Notes

References

External links 
 
 

2023 American television episodes
Television shows directed by Rick Famuyiwa
The Mandalorian episodes